Rear Admiral Nicholas Henry Linton Harris CB MBE (born 26 February 1952) is a former Royal Navy officer who became Flag Officer Scotland, Northern England and Northern Ireland.

Naval career
Educated at Malvern College and the Royal Naval College, Dartmouth, Harris joined the Royal Navy in 1969 and was later given command of the submarines HMS Oberon and then HMS Sovereign. He was appointed Deputy Flag Officer, Submarines in 1999 and naval attaché in Washington D. C. in 2000 before becoming Flag Officer, Scotland, Northern England and Northern Ireland in 2003 and retiring in 2006.

In retirement he became Clerk to the Worshipful Company of Merchant Taylors.

Family
He is married to Jenny; the couple have two daughters.

References

1952 births
Royal Navy rear admirals
People educated at Malvern College
Companions of the Order of the Bath
Members of the Order of the British Empire
Living people
Graduates of Britannia Royal Naval College